Glasgow is the largest city in Scotland. 

Glasgow may also refer to:
 Greater Glasgow Metropolitan Area
 Glasgow (Scottish Parliament electoral region), an electoral region in the Scottish Parliament
 University of Glasgow
 Glasgow Airport
Glasgow Prestwick Airport
Glasgow Subway

Places

Canada
Glasgow, Ontario, a community located in the Regional Municipality of Durham
Glasgow, a community  in Caledon, Ontario

New Zealand
 Glasgow Range, a mountain range on the South Island

Suriname
 Glasgow, Suriname, in Nickerie District

United States
 Glasgow, Alabama, a place in Alabama
 Glasgow, California, a place in California
 Glasgo, Connecticut
 Glasgow, Delaware
 Glasgow, Georgia
 Glasgow, Black Hawk County, Iowa
 Glasgow, Jefferson County, Iowa
 Glasgow, Illinois
 Glasgow, Kentucky
 Glasgow Township, Wabasha County, Minnesota
 Glasgow, Missouri
 Glasgow Village, Missouri
 Glasgow, Montana
 Glasgow, Columbiana County, Ohio
 Glasgow, Tuscarawas County, Ohio
 Glasgow, Oregon
 Glasgow, Pennsylvania
 Glasgow, Virginia
 Glasgow, West Virginia

Sports 
 Celtic F.C., professional football team (sometimes referred to as Glasgow Celtic in an international context, although the city is not in the club name)
 Glasgow City F.C., semi-professional women's football team
 Glasgow Clan, ice hockey team
 Glasgow Gladiators, powerchair football team
 Glasgow Hawks RFC, amateur rugby team
 Glasgow Rocks, basketball team
 Glasgow Tigers (American football)
 Glasgow Tigers (speedway)
 Glasgow Warriors, professional rugby team
 Rangers F.C., professional football team (sometimes referred to as Glasgow Rangers in an international context, although the city is not in the club name)

Transportation
 Glasgow Prestwick Airport, official name of the airport in Ayrshire
 Glasgow station (disambiguation), several railway stations of the name
 Glasgow Subway, underground metro system in the Scottish city
 HMS Glasgow, a name given to eight Royal Navy warships
 HHS Glasgow, a royal yacht of Zanzibar
 SS City of Glasgow, a passenger steamship launched in 1850

Other uses 
 Glasgow (surname), including a list of people with the name
 "Glasgow", a song by They Might Be Giants on the Venue Songs album
 5805 Glasgow, a minor planet
 Glasgow (Cambridge, Maryland), a historic house
 Glasgow Bailie, a type of salted herring (which is also some times known as a Glasgow Magistrate)
 Glasgow effect, a term used to refer to poor health conditions in the Scottish city
 Glasgow Haskell Compiler, one of the leading systems for the Haskell programming language
 Glasgow School, a circle of painters dating to the 1880s & 1890s who were influenced by the "plein-air" landscape paintings of the Barbizon School
 Glasgow Coma Scale, medical term referring to a 15-point scale invented by Glasgow-based neurologists which determines the degree of consciousness of brain-damaged patients
 Glasgow Outcome Scale, a scale so that patients with brain injuries can be divided into groups that allow standardised descriptions of the objective degree of recovery
 Glasgow lease, a type of perpetual land lease used in New Zealand 
 Glasgow dialect, the local dialect in the Scottish city
 Glasgow smile, a facial scar 
 Glasgow, a type of Knightmare Frame in the manga/anime series Code Geass

See also 
 Battle of Glasgow, Missouri
 Park City, Kentucky, formerly known as Glasgow Junction
 New Glasgow (disambiguation)